Matanui profundum, known commonly as the deepwater triplefin, is a species of triplefin blenny in the genus Matanui. It was described by Ronald Fricke and Clive D. Roberts in 1994.

References

Deepwater triplefin
Fish described in 1994